The 1900 Wyoming Cowboys football team represented the University of Wyoming as an independent during the 1900 college football season. Charles Ponting was the team captain.

Schedule

References

Wyoming
Wyoming Cowboys football seasons
Wyoming Cowboys football